Kewanee is an unincorporated community in Lauderdale County, Mississippi, United States. The community is located on the former Alabama Great Southern Railroad and in 1900 had a population of 50 people.

The community's name may be a transfer from Kewanee, Illinois.

The Simmons & Wright Company, listed on the National Register of Historic Places, is located in Kewanee.

Notes

Unincorporated communities in Lauderdale County, Mississippi
Unincorporated communities in Mississippi
Mississippi placenames of Native American origin